Mahendrasinh Sarvaiya is a former Member of Legislative assembly from Palitana constituency in Gujarat for its 12th legislative assembly. He is serving as a Vice-President of BJP Gujarat. He has served as a Chairman of Gujarat Housing Board and also as a President of BJP-Bhavnagar district.

References

Year of birth missing (living people)
Living people
Gujarat MLAs 2007–2012